Cartodere bifasciatus is a species of minute brown scavenger beetles native to Europe.

References

Latridiidae
Beetles described in 1877
Beetles of Europe